Bahar Yilmaz (* 1984 in Ingolstadt) is a German author, who also works as a life coach and lecturer.

Biography
Yilmaz grew up with her sisters in Ingolstadt. Her parents are from Turkey. Trained at various spiritual schools, Yilmaz worked after graduation, among other things, as a sensitive and media consultant.

Her first work, was published by Ansata in 2011, and was written with Pascal Voggenhuber. Further monographs followed in the same publishing house, dealing with healing and self-healing, the human energy body, medial abilities and happiness. The book "You were written in the stars", published by Integral in 2019, entered the bestseller list of the Spiegel in the category non-fiction book.

Yilmaz processes her topics and insights not only in literary form, but also, for example, in contributions for social networks and her podcast entitled "New Spirit". Today she works as a "spiritual success coach" in Germany, Austria and Switzerland, meanwhile with her own practice. Yilmaz leads workshops and seminars, in which third parties are also trained according to her methods. She is also active as a speaker at various events, also with her partner Jeffrey Kastenmüller.

Books

References

External links 
 Offizielle Website von Bahar Yilmaz
 , geführt von Veit Lindau (2019)

1984 births
Living people
German women writers
Spiritual mediums
German psychics
Swiss writers
Swiss psychics
People from Ingolstadt